Doctor Doom (real name Doctor Victor von Doom, or Dr. Doom for short) is a Marvel comic book supervillain. 

Dr. Doom may also refer to:
Doctor Doom character appearing in Fox Comics' Science Comics in 1940
Robert Brazile (b. 1953), American footballer linebacker for the Houston Oilers
Marc Faber (b. 1946), Swiss investment analyst and author of The Gloom Boom & Doom Report
Henry Kaufman (b. 1927), German-born American economist and former vice-chairman of Salomon Inc.
Nouriel Roubini (b. 1959), Turkish-born American economist and professor
Peter Schiff (b. 1964), American investment analyst and president of Euro Pacific Capital Inc.
Keith Matthew Thornton (b. 1963), American rapper Kool Keith (alias Dr. Dooom)

See also
Doom (disambiguation)
MF DOOM
Doctor Droom